Lü Peng is the name of:

 Lü Peng (critic) (born 1956), Chinese curator and art historian
 Lü Peng (footballer) (born 1989), Chinese footballer